Małgorzata Jasica-Ruchała (born January 21, 1961 in Limanowa) is a Polish cross-country skier who competed from 1991 to 1998. Competing in three Winter Olympics, she had her best career finish of eighth in the 4 × 5 km relay at Lillehammer in 1994 and her best individual finish of 14th in the 5 km + 10 km combined pursuit at those same games.

Ruchała's best finish at the FIS Nordic World Ski Championships was 14th in the 15 km event at Val di Fiemme in 1991. Her best World cup finish was 12th in a 10 km event in Slovakia in 1993.

Ruchała's best individual career finish was second in three FIS races at distances up to 10 km from 1993 to 1997.

Cross-country skiing results
All results are sourced from the International Ski Federation (FIS).

Olympic Games

World Championships

World Cup

Season standings

References

External links
 
 Women's 4 x 5 km cross-country relay Olympic results: 1976-2002 

1961 births
Cross-country skiers at the 1992 Winter Olympics
Cross-country skiers at the 1994 Winter Olympics
Cross-country skiers at the 1998 Winter Olympics
Living people
Polish female cross-country skiers
Olympic cross-country skiers of Poland
People from Limanowa
Sportspeople from Lesser Poland Voivodeship